Raymond Russell may refer to:

 Raymond Russell (actor) (1887–1918), American silent film actor
 Raymond Russell (organologist) (1922–1966), British organologist
 Raymond Russell (boxer), American boxer
 Raymond Russell (golfer), Scottish golfer